The Turoni or Turones were a Gallic tribe of dwelling in the later Touraine region during the Iron Age and the Roman period.

They were among the first tribes to give support to the Gallic coalition against Rome led by Vercingetorix in 52 BC, then to the revolt of Sacrovir in 21 AD.

Name 
They are mentioned as Turonos and Turonis by Caesar (mid-1st c. BC), Turones by Pliny (1st c. AD), Turoni by Tacitus (early 2nd c. AD), and as Touroúpioi (Τουρούπιοι, var. τουρογιεῖς) by Ptolemy (2nd c. AD).

A folk etymology from the ancient records of Britain, cited by Geoffrey of Monmouth, Nennius, and the anonymous author of Jesus College MS LXI, attributed the name to Turnus, a nephew of Brutus of Troy who was buried there after dying in battle protecting the Britons from King Goffar of Aquitaine and the Poitevins.

The city of Tours, attested in the 6th c. AD as apud Toronos (in civitate Turonus in 976, Turonis in 1205, Tors in 1266), and the Touraine region, attested in 774 as Turonice civitatis (in pago Turonico in 983, vicecomes Turanie in 1195–96, Touraine in 1220), are named after the Gallic tribe.

Geography 

The Turoni on the middle reaches of the Loire river. It spanned the modern department of Indre-et-Loire, and parts of the Indre and Vienne. Their territory was located south of the Cenomani, east of the Andecavi and the Pictones.

Before the Roman conquest, the main oppidum of the tribe was probably the oppidum of Fondettes, or possibly the one which was found behind the Amboise Castle, called Oppidum des Châtelliers.

During the Roman era, the chief town of the Turonian territory was Caesarodunum, corresponding the modern city of Tours.

References

Bibliography 

Historical Celtic peoples
Gauls
Tribes of pre-Roman Gaul
History of Tours, France